This is a list of television programs broadcast by the defunct Canadian television channel G4.

 Angry Planet
 Anime Current (program block similar to Anime Unleashed)
 Aqua Teen Hunger Force (now airing on Adult Swim)
 Attack of the Show!
 Bang Goes the Theory
 Beer Money!
 Bomb Patrol
 Call for Help
 Campus PD
 Check It Out! with Dr. Steve Brule (now airing on Adult Swim)
 Childrens Hospital (now airing on Adult Swim)
 CNET TV
 Code Monkeys
 Delocated (now airing on Adult Swim)
 The Drinky Crow Show (now airing on Adult Swim)
 Eagleheart (now airing on Adult Swim)
 EP Daily (On Saturdays and Sundays, the show is called EP Weekly.)
 Fat Guy Stuck in Internet (now airing on Adult Swim)
 Freaks and Geeks
 Harvey Birdman, Attorney at Law (now airing on Adult Swim)
 Hurl!
 The IT Crowd
 The Lab with Leo Laporte
 The Liquidator
 Major League Gaming
 Man, Moment, Machine
 Mantracker
 Mary Shelley's Frankenhole (now airing on Adult Swim)
 Meet the Family
 Metalocalypse (now airing on Adult Swim)
 Murdoch Mysteries
 NTSF:SD:SUV:: (now airing on Adult Swim)
 The Office
 Package Deal
 Proving Ground
 Reviews on the Run
 Rude Tube
 The Screen Savers
 Seed
 Squidbillies (now airing on Adult Swim)
 Superjail! (now airing on Adult Swim)
 Survivorman
 Tactical to Practical
 Texhnolyze
 The Tech Effect
 That's Tough
 Tim and Eric Awesome Show, Great Job! (now airing on Adult Swim)
 Titan Maximum (now airing on Adult Swim)
 Tom Goes to the Mayor (now airing on Adult Swim)
 Torrent
 Unbeatable Banzuke
 Undeclared
 The Venture Bros. (now airing on Adult Swim)
 Web Soup
 Which Way To...
 X-Play
 Xavier: Renegade Angel (now airing on Adult Swim)

External links
 G4 Canada

References

G4 Canada